Navy Cut is an Indian brand of cigarettes, owned and manufactured by ITC Limited. It was launched as Wills Filter, and was one of the first filtered Indian cigarettes.

History
Wills Navy Cut was originally manufactured by W.D. & H.O. Wills in the United Kingdom, and was one of the most notable products of the company in the UK. In 1910, ITC Limited (then called "Imperial Tobacco Company of India Limited") commenced its operations in Kolkata. ITC started manufacturing cigarette brands.

Wills Navy Cut Filter Tipped, was launched in July 1963 in India at the price of 10 Annas for a packet of 10 cigarettes. At this time, the biggest task was to assure people that the addition of the filter was meant to enhance the taste they were accustomed to, since many Indians at the time were used to traditional unfiltered cigarettes.

In the years since, Wills Navy Cut was launched in a flat 10s pack with a distinctive red band. The W leaf was also a part of the pack. One of the biggest changes in the brand was to give Navy Cut its due prominence, over time the Wills Crest was replaced by the classic unicorns as well.

In 1988, W.D. & H.O. Wills ceased operations and production of Wills Navy Cut ended in the U.K. However, ITC, an independent company, continued to manufacture and market the cigarette in India. The phrase "From the House of W.D. & H.O. Wills" continue to be printed on the cigarettes and their packaging.

Navy Cut was given a new look in 2012.

The brand name "Wills Navy Cut" is an official registered trademark, registered under class 34.

Marketing
From the beginning, marketing was focused on the concept of the perfect match of filter and tobacco, and the idea that a filter was the perfect addition to a cigarette. The campaign was also one of the first to include women at its heart.

In 1965, ITC Limited launched the "Made for each other" advertising campaign. The print ad featured a happily married couple reading a Polish joke book. The idea was to highlight the "perfect match" of tobacco and filter in an analogy with the perfectly matched couple, appealing to the consumer on both emotional and aspirational grounds. In 1969 ITC introduced the "Wills Made for Each Other" contest to select a perfectly matched couple. Many posters were hung up on prominent street corners until the 1990s, but disappeared when tobacco advertising was banned in India in 2004. The "Made for each other" campaign went on to become one of the longest-running and most recognizable advertising campaigns in India.

The years 1968/69 saw a considerable growth in competition from rival and lower-priced filter cigarettes. However, Navy Cut continued to retain its market share.

2009 saw the launch of Navy Cut Kings.

ITC also released various limited edition packs. Some of the limited edition packs included the "Cricket edition", appealing to cricket fans during the 1996 Wills World Cup; the "New year edition 2009"; and the "Hallmark of Quality", with red and gold branding. A commemorative special edition "40 years of Navy Cut" pack was also sold, including the slogan "Made for each other" on the pack.

Markets
Wills Navy Cut is mainly sold in India, but has also been sold in the United Kingdom, Kuwait, Saudi Arabia and Pakistan.

See also
ITC Limited
List of cigarette brands
Wills World Series
Wills Trophy
1991–92 Wills Trophy
1992–93 Wills Trophy

References

Indian cigarette brands
Companies based in Kolkata
Products introduced in 1910
ITC Limited
Imperial Brands brands